George Alfred Isaacs JP DL (28 May 1883 – 26 April 1979) was a British politician and trades unionist who served in the government of Clement Attlee.

Isaacs was born in Finsbury to a Methodist family.  He married Flora Beasley (1884–1962), daughter of Richard William Beasley and Mary Ann Brett, in 1905. He worked as a printer and became active in trade union organising early in life, becoming General Secretary of the National Society of Operative Printers and Assistants (NATSOPA) from 1909. This post, which he held for forty years, also took him onto the General Council of the Trades Union Congress. He was also active in the Labour Party.

He became involved in local politics in Southwark and was Mayor of the Borough of Southwark from 1919 to 1921. In the 1922 general election he fought Gravesend and was narrowly defeated; he was readopted to fight the seat in the 1923 election and won it from the Conservatives with a majority of 119. He served as Parliamentary Private Secretary to Jimmy Thomas, who was Secretary of State for the Colonies.

In the 1924 election Isaacs lost his seat, but when in 1927 the sitting Labour MP for Southwark North resigned after leaving the party, he was the natural choice to be the new candidate.  However Isaacs failed to take the seat in the byelection and had to wait until the 1929 general election to return to Parliament. Thomas, now Secretary of State for Dominion Affairs, reappointed him as Parliamentary Private Secretary.

When Thomas joined Ramsay MacDonald in the National Government, Isaacs remained with the Labour Party, and in consequence again lost his seat in the 1931 general election when the Labour Party was heavily defeated. He failed by 79 votes to regain his seat in 1935.  Concentrating on union affairs through the 1930s, Isaacs was appointed to a Royal Commission on Workmen's Compensation in 1938. In 1945 he was President of the World Trade Union Conference.

After the MP for Southwark North died in 1939, Isaacs was finally able to regain the seat.  When Labour formed the government after the 1945 election, he was appointed Minister of Labour and National Service. Part of his responsibility was to oversee the successful demobilisation of the wartime British Armed Forces. Following the arrival at London of the troopship Windrush in 1948, carrying about 500 Jamaican men said to be seeking work, Isaacs stated to Members of Parliament:

 "I don't know who sent these men ... it is bound to result in difficulties ... we can give no assurances that they can be found suitable work. I hope no encouragement will be given to others to follow them."

From January 1951 he was Minister of Pensions. Isaacs retired from Parliament in 1959.  He had long since moved to East Molesey in Surrey where he served as a Deputy Lieutenant and as a Justice of the Peace. He was eventually Chairman of the Surrey Bench of Magistrates.

References

External links 
 
 

1883 births
1979 deaths
Deputy Lieutenants of Surrey
Labour Party (UK) MPs for English constituencies
British trade union leaders
Members of Southwark Metropolitan Borough Council
Members of the General Council of the Trades Union Congress
Members of the Privy Council of the United Kingdom
Ministers in the Attlee governments, 1945–1951
UK MPs 1923–1924
UK MPs 1929–1931
UK MPs 1935–1945
UK MPs 1945–1950
UK MPs 1950–1951
UK MPs 1951–1955
UK MPs 1955–1959
English justices of the peace